Zuid-Holland Zuid (literally South South Holland) is an official region of the province of South Holland in the Netherlands. 

It consists of the following subregions:
 Drechtsteden, municipalities: Alblasserdam, Dordrecht, Hendrik-Ido-Ambacht, Papendrecht, Sliedrecht, and Zwijndrecht
 Goeree-Overflakkee, municipality: Goeree-Overflakkee
 Hoeksche Waard, municipality: Hoeksche Waard

See also 
 Rijnmond
 Zuid-Holland Oost
 Zuid-Holland West

References 
  Zuid-Holland Zuid, Province of South Holland

Regions of the Netherlands
Regions of South Holland